Ger O'Driscoll may refer to:

 Ger O'Driscoll (Gaelic footballer), Kerry player
 Ger O'Driscoll (hurler) (born 1987), Cork player